Conor Burke (born 1998) is an Irish hurler who plays for Dublin Senior Championship club St. Vincent's and at inter-county level with the Dublin senior hurling team. He currently lines out at midfield.

Career

A member of the St. Vincent's club in Marino, Burke first came to prominence on the inter-county scene on the Dublin minor team that won the 2016 Leinster Championship. He subsequently progressed onto the Dublin under-21 team as well as lining out with DCU Dóchas Éireann in the Fitzgibbon Cup. Burke was just out of the minor grade when he was added to the Dublin senior hurling team, making his debut during the 2017 Walsh Cup.

Honours

Dublin 
Leinster Minor Hurling Championship: 2016

References

External links
Conor Burke profile at the Dublin GAA website

1998 births
Living people
St Vincents (Dublin) hurlers
Dublin inter-county hurlers